Itaporã is a municipality located in the Brazilian state of Mato Grosso do Sul.

References

Municipalities in Mato Grosso do Sul